Allon is an extinct town in Crawford County in the state of Georgia. The GNIS classifies it as a populated place. Allon is a name derived from the French meaning "in the woods".

History 
Allon was one of many "boom towns" that sprung up in the early 19th century. Allon was formed around the Atlanta Sand & Supply Company, which used the railroads to ship sand for the creation of concrete.

References

Geography of Crawford County, Georgia
Ghost towns in Georgia (U.S. state)